Gharbia Governorate is one of the governorates of Egypt. It is located in the north of the country, south of Kafr El Sheikh Governorate, and north of Monufia Governorate. Its capital is Tanta, which is 90 km north of Cairo, and 120 km south east of Alexandria. The largest city in Gharbia is El Mahalla El Kubra. The total area of Gharbia governorate is 1,942 km2.

Municipal divisions
The governorate is divided into municipal divisions, with a total estimated population, as of July 2017, of 5,018,545. In some instances there is a markaz and a kism with the same name.

History
The name of al-Gharbiyya is an Arabic term meaning "The Western one" or "The Western Side". In the 13th century it comprised 165 villages, while the 15th-century geographer al-Qalqashandi describes it as fertile and prosperous.

El Mahalla El Kobra was the provincial capital until 1836, when it was later succeeded by Tanta.

Historical places:
1- Tanta's museum.
2- ali beik al kabeer avenue.
3- El Sa'aa Square

In modern times, it is notable for the cultivation of cotton, and its textile industry.

Population
In 1960, the governorate numbered 1,815,000 inhabitants. According to population estimates, in 2015 the majority of residents in the governorate lived in rural areas, with an urbanization rate of only 30.0%. Out of an estimated 4,751.865 people residing in the governorate, 3,324,630 people lived in rural areas as opposed to only 1,427,235 in urban areas.

Cities
El Mahalla El Kubra
Kafr El Zayat
Samanoud
Tanta
Zifta
El Santa
Kotoor
Basyoun

Projects and programs
In 2016, Switzerland committed to funding a solid waste management program in Gharbia, a project with the Egyptian Ministry of Environment that will conclude in 2021. The National Solid Waste Management Programme (NSWMP) involves the construction of infrastructure for new, as well as the expansion and improvement of existing waste treatment, landfill, and recycling facilities.

Notable people
 Mohamed Salah (Liverpool F.C. footballer)

See also
 List of cities and towns in Egypt

References

External links
Gharbia Governorate Official website (in Arabic)
 El Watan News of Gharbia Governorate 

 
Governorates of Egypt
Nile Delta